Staggered column is a military formation often used for walking along roads where squad members will walk in a zig-zag pattern.

References

 Staggered Column or Combat Column

Tactical formations